Pietà is an oil on panel painting by Sebastiano del Piombo, executed c. 1516–1517, now in the Museo civico in Viterbo. 

It is the earliest evidence of collaboration between del Piombo and Michelangelo (with the latter providing the cartoon for the work, as confirmed by the existence of preparatory studies) and was commissioned for the church of San Francesco in Viterbo by Giovanni Botonti.

Sources
 Pierluigi De Vecchi ed Elda Cerchiari, I tempi dell'arte, vol. 2, Milano, Bompiani, 1999, .

Paintings by Sebastiano del Piombo
Paintings in Lazio
del Piombo
1517 paintings